Wanda was a weekly literature magazine published in Warsaw. It was one of the first Polish magazines for women.

The magazine was published from 1820 to 1822 by Bruno Kicinski and edited by Franciszek Ksawery Godebski and D. Lisicki. Since 1823, the magazine was published and edited by Franciszek Ksawery Godebski.

References

External links
 WorldCat record

1820 establishments in Poland
Defunct literary magazines published in Poland
Magazines established in 1820
Magazines with year of disestablishment missing
Magazines published in Warsaw
Polish-language magazines
Weekly magazines published in Poland
Women's magazines published in Poland